Ämirxanov Möxämmätfatix Zarif ulı  Fatix Ämirxan (1886–1926) was a Tatar classic writer, editor and publicist.

Ämirxan was born in 1886 in Kazan, Russian Empire. His father was a mullah of Old Stone Mosque Möxämmätzarif Ämirxanov, an author of Qur'anical tafsir and the founder of the Ämirxaniä madrassa.

Ämirxan graduated Möxämmädiä madrassa in Kazan, that was the most prominent Tatar educational institution at that time. In 1906-1907 he lived in Moscow and Saint Petersburg, where he published a Tatar journal for children.

Working in Kazan, Ämirxan was an editor of Äl-İslax (The Renewal), he was published in newspapers Qoyaş (The Sun), Yoldız (The star), İdel (Volga), journals Yalt-yolt (The Lightning) and Añ (The Consciousness ).

Fatix Ämirxan is an author of the stories Fätxulla hazrat (Fätxulla xäzrät) (1909), Xäyät (1911), plays The Youth (Yäşlär) (1913), The Unequal (Tigezsezlär) (1915), novel Half Way Along (Urtalıqta) (1912). in this writings he had reflected the problems of Tatar society in the beginning of the 20th century, tried to imagine the human behavior of the future generations. In 1926 Uncle Şäfiğulla he criticized the dogmatism and fanaticism of the Bolshevism. This satiric novel was published only in 1991. Ämirxan was a follower of realism and upheld national character in literature.
Fatix Ämirxan explored the heritage of Tatar enlighteners, such as Qayum Nasíri, wrote articles on the works of Ğäliäsğar Kamal, Ğafur Qoläxmätov. Ämirxan was one of the admirers of Tuqay's literary works and his close friend.
For many years Ämirxan was paralyzed and eventually died of pulmonary tuberculosis in 1926.

References

Notes

Sources 
 

1886 births
1926 deaths
Tuberculosis deaths in the Soviet Union
Writers from Kazan
Tatar people from the Russian Empire
Tatar people of the Soviet Union
Writers from the Russian Empire
Soviet writers
Tatar writers